Zorich is a family name of Slavic origin.  The following people share this name:

 Alexander Zorich, a collective pen name
 Vladimir A. Zorich (born 1937), Russian mathematician, father of Anton
 Anton Zorich, Russian mathematician teaching in Paris, son of Vladimir
 Chris Zorich (born 1969), American football player
 Louis Zorich (1924–2018), American actor
 Semyon Zorich (1745–1799), Serbian noble